The fifth season of the American television spy drama Burn Notice premiered on June 23, 2011 on the cable television channel USA Network.  The season concluded after its eighteenth episode on December 15, 2011.

Season overview 
Six months after the arrest of Vaughn and the retrieval of the NOC list, Michael has been working with the CIA to capture, imprison, or execute all of the people that worked for the organization that burned him. With only one high-ranking operative remaining, Michael, his boss Raines (Dylan Baker), and partner Max (Grant Show) attempt to extract the final spy, but he commits suicide rather than face the CIA. Having to return to Miami before being reinstated, Michael struggles with civilian life, constantly checking and re-checking inconsistencies in the documents on Management.

In the fourth episode of the season "No Good Deed", Michael and Max work to steal a piece of stolen information and bring it back to the CIA. When Michael shows up to the de-brief, he discovers Max bleeding out on the floor, shot by what is likely the murder weapon beside him. Hearing gunfire, he picks up the weapon and attempts to chase down the murderer, who escapes unidentified. Michael covers his tracks, and the murderer's, before escaping. Michael's suspicions about being framed for the murder are confirmed when Sam discovers a newly opened box of ammunition that matches the murder weapon in the car Michael used to drive to the building. Destroying the weapon, Michael and his team run their investigation parallel to Agent Dani Pearce (Lauren Stamile), the lead investigator for the CIA.

Tracking them through the imposter used to pose as Michael, they find that an extremely complex bomb was prepared to kill him; the intricacies of the bomb lead them to a Romanian war criminal who created the bomb for an old friend, Tavian Korzha (Andrew Howard). Tracking Korzha to his warehouse they catch a glimpse of him but he escapes. Using data from Korzha's computers they locate the source of his funds, which also allows for them to attempt an ambush, which he anticipates, and kidnaps Sam, demanding a meeting with Michael. While he insists on only that time and place, Jesse's NSA and FBI connections lock down the island for the meet, forcing him to stay. However, Michael, reentering his loft after a CIA extraction mission, encounters Agent Pearce, who has found proof of a Charger leaving the scene of Max's murder, enough proof to convince her that Michael was the killer, arresting him at gunpoint. Sam and Jesse intercept the CIA convoy, convincing Pearce to let Michael meet Korzha. While wearing a wire, Michael gets Korzha to confess to the frame and murder, but Korzha kills himself to avoid further interrogation. Michael is exonerated and debriefed.

Upon his return, Michael is kidnapped by Larry Sizemore (Tim Matheson), who has also kidnapped DIA psychiatrist Anson Fullerton (Jere Burns). Using Anson as leverage, Larry forces Michael to help him break into a British consulate and steal information. While Michael's team foil Larry's plot and presumably kill him, the explosives used chain-react with a series of others, inadvertently making Fiona responsible for two other deaths. Her confession was recorded by Fullerton, who is revealed as the final member of the organization that burned Michael. He explains that the organization was started by him and Management and their intentions were initially simple: get burned spies to carry out questionable missions that would never get through the red tape at intelligence agencies. Fullerton uses the information on Fiona as leverage, forcing Michael to work under the organization once again.

The reason for Anson's intervention is to assign Michael the task of traveling to Puerto Rico to locate a hacker who had developed software that will help Anson erase any known information the CIA may have on him and his organization. While Michael does delete the information after obtaining the necessary virus, he tries to find some leverage of his own. The team manages to track Anson on a military-encrypted radio. This leads the team to Benny, Madeline's boyfriend who is also Anson's spy. However, Anson is one step ahead and blows up Benny before they can get any useful information. Anson then forces Jesse and Fiona to go to the Cayman Islands and retrieve his money. Through Agent Harris, Sam then manages to get a meeting with the FBI deputy director, planning to take down Anson. But the team needs to use Anson to help Beatriz, which provides Anson the opportunity to stop Sam. He gets the meeting called off and Sam is investigated as a possible Russian agent by including him in the report that stopped the Russian spy from murdering Beatriz. This is shortly after Anson reveals to Michael that he had met, and acted as a psychiatrist to Michael's father, and due to his father's suspicions, caused the heart attack that killed Frank Westen.

Through files obtained through a Washington, D.C. law firm, Michael discovers a connection to his one-time "handler" Vaughn Anderson, formerly with Anson's organization (and arrested in the Season 4 finale). Through Agent Pearce, Michael arranges a meeting with Vaughn in a prison camp, where he discovers the truth behind Fullerton's actions. Michael had hoped that Anson might simply flee the country after wiping out his connections to the organization and retrieving his frozen money. But Vaughn assures Michael: using the infrastructures already in place, Anson is not retiring, but is re-building the organization from the ground up, along with help from the unwilling Michael Westen.

When the CIA allows Michael to run an operation with an authorized team, Anson takes the opportunity to force Michael to burn the team and Pearce to provide a front line of operatives for his new organization. While Fiona is not willing to accept her freedom over theirs, Michael is adamant that the situation can be redeemed without compromising Fiona. When Anson's mole on the team is uncovered by Michael, he quickly improvises a plan to extract their target and instructs Jesse to remove the framing evidence. When Michael returns home from the mission, however, he discovers Fiona has left to turn herself in and remove Anson's leverage over Michael. Michael arrives at the Federal Building just as Fiona is being arrested.

Cast

Main 

 Jeffrey Donovan as Michael Westen
 Gabrielle Anwar as Fiona Glenanne
 Coby Bell as Jesse Porter
 Bruce Campbell as Sam Axe
 Sharon Gless as Madeline Westen

Recurring 

 Lauren Stamile as Agent Dani Pearce
 Jere Burns as Anson Fullerton 
 Grant Show as Max  
 Andrew Howard as Tavian Korzah 
 Arturo Fernandez as Sugar  
 Charlie Weber as Jacob Starky  
 Steve Zurk as Benny 
 Seth Peterson as Nate Westen    
 Dylan Baker as Raines  
 Todd Stashwick as Carmelo Dante
 Paul Tei as Barry Burkowski  
 Brendan O'Mally as Gabriel Manaro  
 David Fickas as Jack Dixon  
 Tim Matheson as "Dead" Larry Sizemore    
 Ben Watkins as Ricky Watkins  
 Ilza Rosario as Beatriz  
 Marc Macaulay as Agent Harris 
 Robert Wisdom as Vaughn Anderson 
 Kristanna Loken as Rebecca Lang 

Grant Show appeared as Max, an operative with the CIA, for three episodes.  Lauren Stamile appeared in multiple episodes as Dani Pearce, another CIA operative that Michael works with after the death of Max.  Matt Lauria portrayed Ethan, a discharged soldier involved with the CIA, in one episode.  While the role carried the possibility of recurring, he did not return. Dylan Baker returned as Raines, the previously unnamed man seen in the fourth season finale.  Tim Matheson and Todd Stashwick returned as "Dead" Larry Sizemore and Carmelo, while Paul Tei returned as Barry Burkowski, Michael's money-launderer.  Seth Peterson appeared as Michael's brother, Nate Westen.  Jere Burns appeared in various episodes as Anson Fullerton, the man at the top of the organization that burned Michael.  Robert Wisdom returned as Vaughn for one episode, while Ilza Rosario, who portrayed Beatriz in Burn Notice: The Fall of Sam Axe, made one appearance in the series.  Other guest stars included The Big Show, Dean Cain, Charisma Carpenter, David Dayan Fisher, James Frain, Kristanna Loken, J. C. MacKenzie, Eric Roberts, and Gavin Rossdale.

Episodes

References

External links 
 

2011 American television seasons